A Lost Lady is a 1934 American drama film directed by Alfred E. Green and starring by Barbara Stanwyck, Frank Morgan, and Ricardo Cortez. Based on the 1923 novel A Lost Lady by Willa Cather, with a screenplay by Gene Markey and Kathryn Scola, the film is about a woman whose fiancé is murdered by his mistress' husband two days before their wedding. Her uncle sends her away to the mountains, where she meets a man who looks after her and eventually proposes. She accepts even though she does not love him.

Warner Brothers had filmed this story before in 1924 as a silent with Irene Rich.

Plot
Marian and Ned are getting married in two days. Ned is accused by a man of having an affair with his wife and killed in front of her. Marian goes to a resort she loves of in the Canadian Rockies in hopes it will snap her out of her emotional withdrawal. One day while walking alone, she falls off a ledge and injures her leg. She is discovered and rescued by Dan Forrester, and his dog Sandy. Dan visits Marian every day, even though she is still upset about her fiancé's death. Before he goes home, Dan asks her to marry him. She refuses at first, telling him she does not love him, but he is undeterred. At the last moment, she changes her mind and accepts his proposal. After the wedding, however, they sleep in separate bedrooms.

The couple go to Chicago, where he heads a successful law firm. He dotes on Marian, even building her a mansion in the country. He coaxes her out of her depression, and everything is going well enough, until one day Frank Ellinger has to make an emergency landing on her estate after his airplane runs out of fuel. Mistaking her for a servant, he grabs her and kisses her. She slaps him in the face and leaves, but long-dead emotions are stirred within her. They are both surprised when they meet socially. He turns out to run a transport company. She rejects his advances, but he persists. When Dan goes to New York for three weeks on business, Frank sees her every day, and Marian soon falls in love again.

When Dan returns, Marian tells him the news. He is devastated. He stays up all night trying to come to grips with this development, even though he has a major corporate case going to trial the next day. At the trial, he collapses and has a heart attack. Marian, who had already packed her clothes to go to Frank, refuses to leave Dan's side, despite Frank's urging. The tables are turned: now she is the one trying to cheer Dan up. She then realizes she has finally come to love her husband, and tells him so.

Cast
 Barbara Stanwyck as Marian Ormsby Forrester 
 Frank Morgan as Daniel "Dan" Forrester 
 Ricardo Cortez as Frank Ellinger 
 Lyle Talbot as Neil Herbert, a junior law partner who also becomes infatuated with Marian
 Phillip Reed as Ned Montgomery 
 Hobart Cavanaugh as Robert, Forrester's butler 
 Henry Kolker as John Ormsby 
 Rafaela Ottiano as Rosa, Marian's maid 
 Edward McWade as Simpson, Forrester's receptionist 
 Walter Walker as Judge Hardy, one of Dan's friends
 Samuel S. Hinds as Jim Sloane 
 Willie Fung as Forrester's Cook 
 Jameson Thomas as Lord Verrington

Reception
Andre Sennwald, reviewer for The New York Times, dismissed it as a "competent, unexciting and familiar movie" which failed to do justice to the novel.

Cather was so displeased with the film that she forbade any further film or stage adaptations of her work.

References

External links
 
 
 
 

1934 romantic drama films
1934 films
American romantic drama films
American black-and-white films
Films based on American novels
Films directed by Alfred E. Green
Films directed by Phil Rosen
Films set in Chicago
Warner Bros. films
Films based on works by Willa Cather
Films with screenplays by Kathryn Scola
1930s American films